Tyrissa is a genus of moths in the family Erebidae. The genus was erected by Francis Walker in 1866.

Species
Tyrissa abscisa Schaus, 1912 Suriname
Tyrissa acygonia (Hampson, 1924) Paraguay
Tyrissa bellula Schaus, 1912 French Guiana
Tyrissa carola Schaus, 1906 Rio de Janeiro in Brazil
Tyrissa laurentia Dognin, 1912 French Guiana
Tyrissa mascara (Schaus, 1906) Parana in Brazil
Tyrissa multilinea Barnes & McDunnough, 1913 Florida
Tyrissa perstrigata Schaus, 1911 Costa Rica
Tyrissa polygrapha Hampson, 1926 Rio de Janeiro in Brazil
Tyrissa recurva Walker, 1866 south Florida, Dominican Republic
Tyrissa siaha (Schaus, 1911) Costa Rica
Tyrissa thara (Schaus, 1906) Rio de Janeiro in Brazil

References

Omopterini
Moth genera